The Old Pilgrim Baptist Church Cemetery and Kilgore Family Cemetery are a pair of historic cemeteries at 3540 Woodruff Road, southeast of Five Forks, South Carolina.  The Kilgore Cemetery houses the remains of several generations of 19th-century plantation owners in the Kilgore family, while the Old Pilgrim Baptist Church Cemetery is an African-American burial ground established in 1868 by former slaves of the Kilgore plantation.  The Kilgore Cemetery's funerary markers include several examples cut by W.T. White, a regionally prominent stone cutter.

The cemeteries were added to the National Register of Historic Places in 2017.

See also
 National Register of Historic Places listings in Greenville County, South Carolina

References

External links
 

Cemeteries on the National Register of Historic Places in South Carolina
National Register of Historic Places in Greenville County, South Carolina
African-American cemeteries